Naomi Namasenda (born 14 November 1993), known mononymously as Namasenda, is a Swedish singer and songwriter from Stockholm. She is most well known for releases on British pop and electronic label, PC Music.

Graduation and music career

Namasenda was born in Sweden to Ugandan parents.
In 2012, she was awarded a vocal scholarship by the Hollywood Chamber of Commerce. She graduated from the Musicians Institute and moved back to Sweden to work on new music and released her debut single "Here" in 2016, featuring BFOTY. There, she was hand picked as a breakthrough act by Red Bull Select. In 2017, she released her debut EP, hot_babe_93, and presented awards at the Swedish Grammys.

In 2019, with the release of her single "24/7", she became the first Black artist to sign to PC Music. In the same year she featured on US singer LIZ's Planet Y2K album. She released "Dare (AM)" and "Dare (PM)" in April 2020, both singles produced by A. G. Cook, followed by "Wanted" in November 2020.

Namasenda released "Demonic", "Banana Clip", "Finish Him", and "No Regrets" as singles off of her debut Unlimited Ammo mixtape, which was released on 28 October 2021.

Discography

Mixtapes

Remix albums

EPs

Singles

Other appearances

References 

1993 births
Living people
People from Olofström Municipality
Swedish singer-songwriters
Swedish electronic musicians
Swedish pop musicians
Swedish people of Ugandan descent
PC Music artists
Experimental pop musicians
Future bass musicians